Haridhali Union is a union parishad in Paikgachha Upazila of Khulna District, in Khulna Division, Bangladesh.

Geography
It shares borders with Tala upazila and Kapilmuni union on the north, Lata union on the east and Jalarpur union of Tala upazila in Satkhira district on the west and Gadaipur union on the south.

References

Unions of Paikgachha Upazila
Populated places in Khulna District